Hot Ice is a 1955 short subject directed by Jules White starring American slapstick comedy team The Three Stooges (Moe Howard, Larry Fine and Shemp Howard). It is the 165th entry in the series released by Columbia Pictures starring the comedians, who released 190 shorts for the studio between 1934 and 1959.

Plot
The Stooges are wannabe detectives who inadvertently get their chance to crack a case in Scotland. They manage to stumble on a lead concerning the priceless Punjab diamond being stolen by a crook named Dapper (Kenneth MacDonald). With dreams of becoming genuine detectives, the trio head for Squid McGuffy's cafe asking for the whereabouts of Dapper. They manage to convince everyone at the restaurant that they are actually police.

While searching several rooms above the cafe, the Stooges stumble on Dapper's moll (Christine McIntyre), who hastily hides the Punjab diamond in a candy dish. The boys refuse to leave, suspecting Dapper will eventually show his face. While killing time, Shemp starts to flirt with the moll, and manages to swallow the ice along with some mints from the candy dish. The gal nearly has a nervous breakdown but quickly discovers the Stooges are not actually real detectives. She calls in Dapper and his henchman Muscles (Cy Schindell) and frantically try to pry the diamond out of frazzled Shemp.

After all else fails, Dapper decides to cut him open. Moe and Larry are locked in a closet by Muscles while Shemp is tied down on a close by desk-turned-operating table. As luck would have it, there happen to be a bag of tools in the closet, which Moe and Larry use to saw their way out of the closet, and right into a gorilla's cage on the other side of the wall. The gorilla knocks Moe, Larry, Dapper and Muscles cold. The beast, however, befriends Shemp, and helps him cough up the diamond. Moments later, Shemp explains how he managed to swallow the diamond by actually doing so again.

Cast

Credited
 Moe Howard as Moe
 Larry Fine as Larry
 Shemp Howard as Shemp
 Kenneth MacDonald as Dapper Malone
 Christine McIntyre as Bea (stock footage)
 Barbara Bartay as Girl in Bar

Uncredited
 Lester Allen as Runty (stock footage)
 Cy Schindell as Muscles (stock footage)
 Joe Palma as Muscles (new footage)
 Ray "Crash" Corrigan as Harold the gorilla (stock footage)
 George Lloyd as Squid McGuffey
 Clive Morgan as Inspector McCormick (stock footage)
 James Logan as Dawson (stock footage)
 Jimmy Aubrey as Hawkins
 Heinie Conklin as Bartender
 Harry Wilson as Bum in bed
 Blackie Whiteford as Seaman (stock footage)

Production notes
Hot Ice is a remake of 1948's Crime on Their Hands, using ample recycled footage. In addition, the Scotland Yard scenes were recycled from 1948's The Hot Scots. New scenes were filmed on January 17, 1955.

Joe Palma doubles for the late Cy Schindell in new footage. Schindell had died in 1948.

Critical reception

DVD Talk critic Stuart Galbraith IV deemed Hot Ice "another pointless reworking of material done better the first time around," saying that "the few scraps of new footage...have no particular reason to exist, and are inserted throughout via extremely awkward edits. Take a gander at the sloppy cut between the Three Stooges and the Three Significantly Older Stooges at 10:14; even their clothes don't match." Galbraith also called out director Jules White's penchant for recycling footage, stating that White was "apparently a man with no scruples but a lot of chutzpah: though Edward Bernds directed both earlier shorts, which account for about 90 percent of Hot Ice's running time, White listed only himself as its director."

See also
List of American films of 1955

External links
 
 
Hot Ice at threestooges.net

References

1955 films
1955 comedy films
The Three Stooges films
American black-and-white films
The Three Stooges film remakes
Films directed by Jules White
Columbia Pictures short films
1950s English-language films
1950s American films
American comedy short films